Lathe of Heaven is a 2002 American science fiction television film based on the 1971 novel The Lathe of Heaven by Ursula K. Le Guin, which was previously adapted as a television film in 1980. The film was directed by Philip Haas, written by Alan Sharp, and stars James Caan, Lukas Haas, and Lisa Bonet. It aired on A&E on September 8, 2002. It was nominated at the 29th Saturn Awards for Best Single Program Presentation.

Synopsis
Unlike the 1980 adaptation, this film discards a significant portion of the plot, some minor characters, and much of the philosophical underpinnings of the book. The alien invasion and the racial equalization were removed for this adaptation.

The film takes place in a futuristic society, where a young man named George Orr overdoses using someone else's pharmacy card. Orr is troubled by his dreams, and is implied to be suicidal because of them. He takes drugs to avoid having these dreams. After he is caught overdosing, his attorney Heather Lelache sends him to a psychologist as a punishment.

The psychologist, William Haber, uses a machine called an "augmentor" to delve deep into Orr's mind. The augmentor looks like a dentist's chair. It is soon obvious that Haber has sinister intentions. He begins to hypnotize Orr into dreaming about a horse in a field. When Orr wakes up from his hypnosis-induced dream, an image of Lady Godiva on a horse is now painted on the wall in the office.

Haber then begins to use Orr's power for his own personal gain. At one point, he changes his status from an M.D. to a highly renowned researcher.

Cast
 James Caan as Dr. William Haber
 Lukas Haas as George Orr
 Lisa Bonet as Heather Lelache
 David Strathairn as Mannie
 Sheila McCarthy as Penny
 Serge Houde as Judge

Production
Filming took place in Montreal.

References

External links
 
 Lathe of Heaven at Rotten Tomatoes
 
 

2002 television films
2002 films
2002 science fiction films
2000s American films
2000s English-language films
A&E (TV network) original films
Adaptations of works by Ursula K. Le Guin
Alliance Atlantis films
American science fiction television films
Films about dreams
Films about hypnosis
Films based on American novels
Films based on science fiction novels
Films directed by Philip Haas
Films scored by Angelo Badalamenti
Films set in the future
Films shot in Montreal
Television films based on books